Alan W.  Meerow is an American botanist, born in New York City in 1952. He specializes in the taxonomy of the family Amaryllidaceae and the horticulture of palms and tropical ornamental plants.  He also works on the population genetics and molecular systematics of cycads and palms.

He studied at the Bronx High School of Science and then at the University of New York. Dropping out after a year, aged 19, he moved to Santa Cruz, California.  After living on a farm for four years he decided to resume his studies in botany and horticulture at the University of California.

Initially his interest in botany was focused on trees, working for three years in the arboretum of the University.  He graduated in December 1978 and continued his postgraduate study at the University of Florida, after working for two years at the Marie Selby Botanical Gardens in Sarasota, Florida, where his interest in Amaryllidaceae was stimulated. His master's thesis, in 1983, was on the taxonomy of the genus Eucharis. He continued with the same subject in his doctoral studies, producing his thesis entitled "A Monograph of Eucharis and Caliphruria (Amaryllidaceae)"  in 1986.

He then moved to the University of Florida's Fort Lauderdale Research and Education Center where he was a palm and tropical ornamental specialist.  As well as carrying out research on the phylogeny and taxonomy of the Amaryllidaceae, he bred Hippeastrum and other ornamental species.  In 1998 the International Bulb Society awarded him the Herbert Medal in recognition of his contributions to the knowledge of bulbous plants.

From October 1999 until July 2019, he was located at the National Germplasm Repository of the United States Department of Agriculture/Agricultural Research Service (USDA-ARS), based in Miami, working on the conservation, genetics, systematics, characterization, and breeding of species of subtropical and tropical ornamentals.  In 2005, the American Society of Plant Taxonomists awarded him the Peter Raven Award for Scientific Outreach. In 2017, he was awarded the David Fairchild Medal for Plant Exploration by the National Tropical Botanical Garden. Upon retirement from USDA, Meerow became a Research Fellow of the Montgomery Botanical Center in Coral Gables, FL, and is an adjunct professor in the School of Life Sciences at Arizona State University.

Selected publications 
Meerow has published over 250 scientific papers, numerous magazine and university extension articles, and is the author or co-author of three popular books on palms.
 
(additional excerpts)
 , in 
  
 
 
 
 
 
  Full text 
 
 
 , in 

 
 
 
 
 
 
 
 
 
 
 
 
 
 
 
 
 Jestrow, B., Peguero, B., Jiménez, F., Verdecia, R., González-Oliva, L., Moya, C.E., Cinea, W., Griffith, M.P., Meerow, A.W., Maunder, M. and Francisco-Ortega, J., 2017. A conservation framework for the Critically Endangered endemic species of the Caribbean palm Coccothrinax. Oryx, pp. 1–12. doi:10.1017/S0030605317000588.. 
 Meerow, A.W., Reed, S.T., Dunn, C. and Schnell, E., 2017. Fragrance analysis of two scented Hippeastrum species. HortScience 52: 1853–1860.
 
 Campos-Rocha, A., A. W. Meerow & J. H. A. Dutilh. 2018. Two new critically endangered species of Hippeastrum (Amaryllidaceae) from the Brazilian Cerrado. Phytotaxa 360: 91–102.
 de Lima, N.E., Carvalho, A. A., Meerow, A. W. and Manfrin, M. H. 2018. A review of the palm genus Acrocomia: Neotropical green gold. Organism Diversity and Evolution 18: 151–161.

References

Bibliography 

 
  Excerpts

External links 
Alan Meerow: Google Scholar citations

Alan Meerow ORCID record

21st-century American botanists
Botanists with author abbreviations
Living people
1952 births